Nøddebo Præstegård (Nøddebo Parsonage) is a 1934 Danish family film Christmas classic directed by George Schnéevoigt and written by frequent collaborator Fleming Lynge and Svend Rindom and based on the novel Ved Nytaarstid i Nøddebo Præstegaard written by Henrik Scharling. The score is by Kai Normann Andersen. The film stars Johannes Meyer and Karin Nellemose. The film was remade in 1974.

The film adaptation was dubbed as Denmark’s favorite Christmas comedy. The counterpart theater play which also bears the same title was first played at Folketeatret, 125 years ago. It was performed more than 1,500 times.

Plot
The story revolves around the Christmas adventures of three students in Nøddebo, in the 1860s. Siblings Christopher, Frederick and Nicolai were invited by the local pastor and his wife for the holiday celebration. Christopher and Frederick fell in-love with the daughters of their host family. Nicolai, however, wooed the girls and felt distraught when he found out about his older brothers’ feelings.

Cast
Hans Egede Budtz
Charles Tharnæs
Hans Kurt
Johannes Meyer
Katy Valentin
Karin Nellemose
Maria Garland
Schiøler Linck
Kai Holm
Rasmus Christiansen
Karen Poulsen
Pouel Kern

See also
 List of Christmas films

References

External links

Nøddebo Præstegård at the Danish Film Database (in Danish)

1934 drama films
1934 films
Danish black-and-white films
Danish Christmas drama films
1930s Danish-language films
Films directed by George Schnéevoigt
1930s Christmas drama films